The EFF Prometheus was an unusual two seat motor glider powered by a pair of small turbojet engines, designed and constructed in Switzerland in the 1970s. Two versions with different spans were built, but it did not go into production.

Design and development

In 1970 EFF began work on a turbojet powered version of the FFA Diamant 18 sailplane. This, named the Prometheus 1, first flew on 21 June 1971. It was initially powered by a  Microturbo Eclair II, later replaced by a  Microturbo TRS 25. The engine was mounted on a short pylon to the rear of the cockpit above the wing centre line. Apart from the addition of the engine and associated fuel tanks and accessories, the aircraft was essentially the single seat Diamant 18. The all-moving tail of the Diamant was replaced by a conventional one.

Design work on the Prometheus 19 began in about 1971 and construction was started in 1975, leading to a first flight on 22 June 1978.  Its wing had a single aluminium spar and was skinned with plywood infilled with glass fibre/foam sandwich. It was fitted with flaperons for lateral control and lift generation, combined with DFS-type airbrakes operating only from the upper wing surface.

The forward fuselage had a wooden structure skinned with glass fibre.  The cockpit, ahead of the wing, seated two side by side . Two  Microturbo TRS 18 engines were mounted behind the cockpit, fed from a pair of dorsal intakes immediately aft of the glazing and exhausting over the rear fuselage a little behind the wing trailing edge.  This section of the fuselage and the empennage were constructed from glass-fibre sandwich.  The Prometheus had a tall, straight edged fin with the narrow chord tailplane and single elevator on top in T-configuration. It landed on a retractable tricycle undercarriage.  The mainwheels were sprung on rubber blocks and were fitted with brakes; the nosewheel had an oleo shock absorber.

The Prometheus 12 was a variant with a  span wing to improve the performance envelope and increase structural strength.

Variants
Prometheus 1The first prototype, consisting of a Diamant 18 airframe powered by a  Microturbo Eclair II, later replaced by a  Microturbo TRS 25.
Prometheus 19 The initial production configuration with a span of  powered by 2 x   Microturbo TRS 18 engines mounted behind the cockpit. Flown 22 June 1978.
First flown 17 September 1979.
Promethus PV As Prometheus 12, with tip tanks.  No production intended.

Specifications (Prometheus 19)

References

External links
Wortmann FX-67-170-17 airfoil

1970s Swiss sailplanes
Aircraft first flown in 1978
Mid-wing aircraft
T-tail aircraft
Twinjets